Adil Abdullah Mahdi Al-Douri (1945 - March 22, 2004) was an Iraqi politician and a member of the regional leadership of the Arab Socialist Ba'ath Party, and was responsible for the organizations of Dhi Qar Governorate. He was born in 1945 in Al-Dour.

Prior to that, he held the position of secretary of the leadership of the Fallujah branch of the Arab Socialist Ba'ath Party, and was a member of the Iraqi National Council.

After the 2003 invasion
His name was included in the list of Iraqis most wanted by the United States, and he appeared in a deck of playing cards for the most wanted Iraqis. He was arrested on May 15, 2003 in the city of Tikrit of Al-Dour.

Death
He died on March 22, 2004 in Al-Dour Hospital, after the US occupation forces transferred him due to kidney failure a month before his death.

References

External links

1945 births
2004 deaths
Members of the Regional Command of the Arab Socialist Ba'ath Party – Iraq Region
Iraq War prisoners of war
Iraqi prisoners of war
Most-wanted Iraqi playing cards